Polybius (c. 203 BC – 120 BC) was an ancient Greek historian.

Polybius may also refer to:

People
 Polybius (freedman) (fl. 1st century), freedman and later secretariat under the Roman Emperor Claudius
 Polybius of Tralles, a 2nd-century Christian bishop mentioned in the writings of Ignatius of Antioch

Other uses
 Polybius (crab), a genus of swimming crabs
 Polybius (crater), a lunar impact crater
 Polybius (urban legend), a fictitious video game featured in urban legend
 Polybius (2017 video game), released for the PlayStation 4
 Polybius square, a cipher key technique
 "Polybius", the fourth episode of Dimension 404, based on the urban legend
 Polybius Bank, Estonian bank